Three Girls may refer to:

De tribus puellis or The Three Girls, an anonymous medieval Latin poem
Three Girls (painting), a 1935 painting by Amrita Sher-Gil
Three Girls (TV series), a 2017 British TV drama series

See also
Take Three Girls, a 1969–1971 BBC TV series